The 2013 Seattle Sounders FC season was the club's fifth season in Major League Soccer, the United States' top-tier of professional soccer. For the Sounders FC organization, it was their fifth year of existence, and including all previous clubs, it was the 33rd season of soccer in Seattle.

Players

Squad information 
Major League Soccer team are limited to seven players without U.S. citizenship, a permanent resident (green card holder), or the holder of other special status (e.g., refugee or asylum status).

Out on loan

Transfer summary 

Seattle finished its 2012 season by releasing Mike Seamon and Andrew Weber on December 4. Three days later, the club traded Jeff Parke to the Philadelphia Union in exchange for the fifth pick in the 2013 MLS Supplemental Draft.

In

Loan in

Draft picks

On Trial (In)

Out

Loan out

Unsigned Draft Picks

On Trial (Out)

Board and staff

Facilities

Season overview

Preseason 
On October 11, during the tail end of the 2012 regular season campaign, it was announced that Seattle Sounders FC would be participating in the 2013 Desert Diamond Cup with the dates of the matches announced.

Match results

Preseason

The Desert Friendlies presented by FC Tucson

Desert Diamond Cup

Table standings

Group stage

Final

Other preseason games

Competitions

Overview

CONCACAF Champions League

2012–13 edition

Championship Round

Quarterfinals

Semifinals

MLS regular season

Standings

Western Conference

Overall table 
Note: the table below has no impact on playoff qualification and is used solely for determining host of the MLS Cup, certain CCL spots, and 2014 MLS draft. The conference tables are the sole determinant for teams qualifying to the playoffs

Results summary

Results by round

Match results

MLS Cup Playoffs

Knockout round

Conference semifinals

U.S. Open Cup

Cascadia Cup

Heritage Cup 

The competition began in 2009 when the expansion Seattle Sounders FC began play, becoming the second MLS team named after their NASL counterpart — the San Jose Earthquakes having been the first.

Squad information 
As of November 7, 2013.

Squad statistics

Appearances and goals 

 

|-
|colspan="14"|Players who left the club during the season: (Statistics shown are the appearances made and goals scored while at Seattle Sounders)

Top scorers 
Includes all competitive matches. The list is sorted by shirt number when total goals are equal.

{| class="wikitable" style="font-size: 95%; text-align: center;"
|-
!width=15 style="background:#5d9731; color:white; text-align:center;"|
!width=15 style="background:#5d9731; color:white; text-align:center;"|
!width=15 style="background:#5d9731; color:white; text-align:center;"|
!width=15 style="background:#5d9731; color:white; text-align:center;"|
!width=225 style="background:#5d9731; color:white; text-align:center;"|Name	
!width=125 style="background:#5d9731; color:white; text-align:center;"|MLS Regular Season
!width=125 style="background:#5d9731; color:white; text-align:center;"|MLS Cup Playoffs
!width=125 style="background:#5d9731; color:white; text-align:center;"|Champions League	
!width=125 style="background:#5d9731; color:white; text-align:center;"|U.S. Open Cup	
!width=55 style="background:#5d9731; color:white; text-align:center;"|Total	
|-
|rowspan=1|1
|7
|FW
|
|Eddie Johnson
|9
|2
|1
|0
|12
|-
|rowspan=1|2
|27
|MF
|
|Lamar Neagle
|8
|0
|1
|0
|9
|-
|rowspan=1|3
|9
|FW
|
|Obafemi Martins
|8
|0
|0
|0
|8
|-
|rowspan=1|4
|3
|MF
|
|Brad Evans
|4
|1
|0
|0
|5
|-
|rowspan=1|5
|10
|MF
|
|Mauro Rosales
|4
|0
|0
|0
|4
|-
|rowspan=1|6
|17
|DF
|
|DeAndre Yedlin
|1
|1
|1
|0
|3
|-
|rowspan=1|7
|19
|DF
|
|Djimi Traoré
|1
|0
|1
|0
|2
|-
|rowspan=5|8
|2
|FW
|
|Clint Dempsey
|1
|0
|0
|0
|1
|-
|6
|MF
|
|Osvaldo Alonso
|0
|1
|0
|0
|1
|-
|21
|MF
|
|Shalrie Joseph
|1
|0
|0
|0
|1
|-
|23
|MF
|
|Servando Carrasco
|1
|0
|0
|0
|1
|-
|25
|MF
|
|Andy Rose
|1
|0
|0
|0
|1
|-
|
|
|
|
|
|3
|0
|0
|0
|3
|-
|colspan="4"|
! style="background:#1047AB; color:white; text-align:center;"|TOTALS
! style="background:#1047AB; color:white; text-align:center;"|42
! style="background:#1047AB; color:white; text-align:center;"|5
! style="background:#1047AB; color:white; text-align:center;"|4
! style="background:#1047AB; color:white; text-align:center;"|0
! style="background:#1047AB; color:white; text-align:center;"|51

Italic: denotes no longer with club.

Top assists 

Includes all competitive matches. The list is sorted by shirt number when total assists are equal.	
{| class="wikitable" style="font-size: 95%; text-align: center;"	
|-	
!width=15 style="background:#5d9731; color:white; text-align:center;"|	
!width=15 style="background:#5d9731; color:white; text-align:center;"|	
!width=15 style="background:#5d9731; color:white; text-align:center;"|	
!width=15 style="background:#5d9731; color:white; text-align:center;"|	
!width=225 style="background:#5d9731; color:white; text-align:center;"|Name	
!width=125 style="background:#5d9731; color:white; text-align:center;"|MLS Regular Season
!width=125 style="background:#5d9731; color:white; text-align:center;"|MLS Cup Playoffs
!width=125 style="background:#5d9731; color:white; text-align:center;"|Champions League	
!width=125 style="background:#5d9731; color:white; text-align:center;"|U.S. Open Cup	
!width=55 style="background:#5d9731; color:white; text-align:center;"|Total	
|-	
|rowspan=1|1	
|10	
|MF	
|	
|Mauro Rosales	
|8
|0	
|0	
|0	
|8	
|-	
|rowspan=1|2	
|3	
|MF	
|	
|Brad Evans	
|5
|0	
|0	
|0	
|5	
|-	
|rowspan=2|3	
|8	
|DF	
|	
|Marc Burch	
|4
|0	
|0	
|0	
|4
|-
|27	
|MF	
|	
|Lamar Neagle	
|4
|0	
|0	
|0	
|4		
|-
|rowspan=2|5	
|9	
|FW	
|	
|Obafemi Martins	
|3
|0	
|0	
|0	
|3
|-	
|17	
|DF	
|	
|DeAndre Yedlin	
|2
|1	
|0	
|0	
|3	
|-		
|rowspan=3|7	
|7	
|FW	
|	
|Eddie Johnson	
|2	
|0
|0	
|0	
|2	
|-	
|11	
|MF	
|	
|Steve Zakuani	
|1
|0	
|1	
|0	
|2		
|-	
|25	
|MF	
|	
|Andy Rose	
|2
|0	
|0	
|0	
|2	
|-	
|rowspan=6|10
|2	
|FW	
|	
|Clint Dempsey	
|0
|1	
|0	
|0	
|1	
|-		
|6	
|MF	
|	
|Osvaldo Alonso	
|1
|0	
|0	
|0	
|1	
|-	
|12	
|DF	
|	
|Leonardo González	
|1
|0	
|0	
|0	
|1	
|-	
|15	
|MF	
|	
|Mario Martínez	
|1
|0	
|0	
|0	
|1
|-	
|21	
|MF	
|	
|Shalrie Joseph	
|0
|1	
|0	
|0	
|1	
|-	
|23	
|MF	
|	
|Servando Carrasco	
|1
|0	
|0	
|0	
|1	
|-	
|colspan="4"|	
! style="background:#1047AB; color:white; text-align:center;"|TOTALS	
! style="background:#1047AB; color:white; text-align:center;"|35	
! style="background:#1047AB; color:white; text-align:center;"|3	
! style="background:#1047AB; color:white; text-align:center;"|1	
! style="background:#1047AB; color:white; text-align:center;"|0	
! style="background:#1047AB; color:white; text-align:center;"|39

Italic: denotes no longer with club.

Clean sheets 
Includes all competitive matches. The list is sorted by shirt number when total clean sheets are equal.

{| class="wikitable" style="font-size: 95%; text-align: center;"
|-
!width=15 style="background:#5d9731; color:white; text-align:center;"|
!width=15 style="background:#5d9731; color:white; text-align:center;"|
!width=15 style="background:#5d9731; color:white; text-align:center;"|
!width=15 style="background:#5d9731; color:white; text-align:center;"|
!width=225 style="background:#5d9731; color:white; text-align:center;"|Name	
!width=125 style="background:#5d9731; color:white; text-align:center;"|MLS Regular Season
!width=125 style="background:#5d9731; color:white; text-align:center;"|MLS Cup Playoffs
!width=125 style="background:#5d9731; color:white; text-align:center;"|Champions League	
!width=125 style="background:#5d9731; color:white; text-align:center;"|U.S. Open Cup	
!width=55 style="background:#5d9731; color:white; text-align:center;"|Total	
|-
|rowspan=1|1
|1
|GK
|
|Michael Gspurning
|10
|1
|0
|0
|11
|-
|rowspan=1|2
|24
|GK
|
|Marcus Hahnemann
|1
|0
|0
|0
|1
|-
|rowspan=2|3
|29
|GK
|
|Josh Ford
|0
|0
|0
|0
|0
|-
|37
|GK
|
|Andrew Weber
|0
|0
|0
|0
|0
|-
|colspan="4"|
! style="background:#1047AB; color:white; text-align:center;"|TOTALS
! style="background:#1047AB; color:white; text-align:center;"|11
! style="background:#1047AB; color:white; text-align:center;"|1
! style="background:#1047AB; color:white; text-align:center;"|0
! style="background:#1047AB; color:white; text-align:center;"|0
! style="background:#1047AB; color:white; text-align:center;"|12

Italic: denotes no longer with club.

Disciplinary record 
Includes all competitive matches. The list is sorted by shirt number when total cards are equal.

{| class="wikitable" style="font-size: 95%; text-align: center;"
|-
| rowspan="2"  style="width:2.5%;background:#5d9731; text-align:center; color:white;"|
| rowspan="2"  style="width:3%;background:#5d9731; text-align:center; color:white;"|
| rowspan="2"  style="width:3%;background:#5d9731; text-align:center; color:white;"|
| rowspan="2"  style="width:3%;background:#5d9731; text-align:center; color:white;"|
| rowspan="2"  style="width:15%;background:#5d9731; text-align:center; color:white;"|Name
| colspan="3" style="text-align:center;background:#5d9731; color:white;"|MLS Regular Season
| colspan="3" style="text-align:center;background:#5d9731; color:white;"|MLS Cup Playoffs
| colspan="3" style="text-align:center;background:#5d9731; color:white;"|Champions League
| colspan="3" style="text-align:center;background:#5d9731; color:white;"|U.S. Open Cup
| colspan="3" style="text-align:center;background:#5d9731; color:white;"|Total
|-
!  style="width:25px; background:#fe9;"|
!  style="width:28px; background:#ff8888;"|
!  style="width:25px; background:#ff8888;"|
!  style="width:25px; background:#fe9;"|
!  style="width:28px; background:#ff8888;"|
!  style="width:25px; background:#ff8888;"|
!  style="width:25px; background:#fe9;"|
!  style="width:28px; background:#ff8888;"|
!  style="width:25px; background:#ff8888;"|
!  style="width:25px; background:#fe9;"|
!  style="width:28px; background:#ff8888;"|
!  style="width:25px; background:#ff8888;"|
!  style="width:25px; background:#fe9;"|
!  style="width:35px; background:#ff8888;"|
!  style="width:35px; background:#ff8888;"|
|-
|rowspan=1|1
|20
|DF
|
|Zach Scott
|7
|2
|0
|0
|0
|0
|1
|0
|0
|0
|0
|0
|8
|2
|0
|-
|rowspan=1|2
|7
|FW
|
|Eddie Johnson
|6
|0
|0
|1
|0
|0
|1
|0
|0
|0
|0
|0
|8
|0
|0
|-
|rowspan=4|3
|6
|MF
|
|Osvaldo Alonso
|3
|0
|1
|0
|0
|0
|1
|0
|0
|0
|0
|0
|4
|0
|1
|-
|12
|DF
|
|Leonardo González
|4
|0
|1
|0
|0
|0
|0
|0
|0
|0
|0
|0
|4
|0
|1
|-
|19
|DF
|
|Djimi Traoré
|5
|0
|0
|0
|0
|0
|0
|0
|0
|0
|0
|0
|5
|0
|0
|-
|34
|FW
|
|Jhon Kennedy Hurtado
|5
|0
|0
|0
|0
|0
|0
|0
|0
|0
|0
|0
|5
|0
|0
|-
|rowspan=1|7
|27
|MF
|
|Lamar Neagle
|1
|0
|1
|2
|0
|0
|0
|0
|0
|0
|0
|0
|3
|0
|1
|-
|rowspan=3|8
|3
|MF
|
|Brad Evans
|3
|0
|0
|0
|0
|0
|0
|0
|0
|0
|0
|0
|3
|0
|0
|-
|10
|MF
|
|Mauro Rosales
|2
|0
|0
|0
|0
|0
|1
|0
|0
|0
|0
|0
|3
|0
|0
|-
|17
|DF
|
|DeAndre Yedlin
|2
|0
|1
|0
|0
|0
|0
|0
|0
|0
|0
|0
|2
|0
|1
|-
|rowspan=4|11
|1
|GK
|
|Michael Gspurning
|0
|0
|0
|0
|0
|1
|1
|0
|0
|0
|0
|0
|1
|0
|1
|-
|21
|MF
|
|Shalrie Joseph
|1
|0
|1
|0
|0
|0
|0
|0
|0
|0
|0
|0
|1
|0
|1
|-
|23
|MF
|
|Servando Carrasco
|2
|0
|0
|0
|0
|0
|0
|0
|0
|0
|0
|0
|2
|0
|0
|-
|25
|MF
|
|Andy Rose
|2
|0
|0
|0
|0
|0
|0
|0
|0
|0
|0
|0
|2
|0
|0
|-
|rowspan=7|15
|2
|FW
|
|Clint Dempsey
|0
|0
|0
|1
|0
|0
|0
|0
|0
|0
|0
|0
|1
|0
|0
|-
|4
|DF
|
|Patrick Ianni
|1
|0
|0
|0
|0
|0
|0
|0
|0
|0
|0
|0
|1
|0
|0
|-
|8
|DF
|
|Marc Burch
|0
|0
|0
|1
|0
|0
|0
|0
|0
|0
|0
|0
|1
|0
|0
|-
|14
|MF
|
|Alex Caskey
|0
|0
|0
|0
|0
|0
|0
|0
|0
|1
|0
|0
|1
|0
|0
|-
|15
|MF
|
|Mario Martínez
|0
|0
|0
|0
|0
|0
|0
|0
|0
|1
|0
|0
|1
|0
|0
|-
|24
|GK
|
|Marcus Hahnemann
|0
|0
|1
|0
|0
|0
|0
|0
|0
|0
|0
|0
|0
|0
|1
|-
|26
|MF
|
|Adam Moffat
|1
|0
|0
|0
|0
|0
|0
|0
|0
|0
|0
|0
|1
|0
|0
|-
|colspan="4"|
! style="background:#1047AB; color:white; text-align:center;"|TOTALS
! style="background:#1047AB; color:white; text-align:center;"|45
! style="background:#1047AB; color:white; text-align:center;"|2
! style="background:#1047AB; color:white; text-align:center;"|6
! style="background:#1047AB; color:white; text-align:center;"|5
! style="background:#1047AB; color:white; text-align:center;"|0
! style="background:#1047AB; color:white; text-align:center;"|1
! style="background:#1047AB; color:white; text-align:center;"|5
! style="background:#1047AB; color:white; text-align:center;"|0
! style="background:#1047AB; color:white; text-align:center;"|0
! style="background:#1047AB; color:white; text-align:center;"|2
! style="background:#1047AB; color:white; text-align:center;"|0
! style="background:#1047AB; color:white; text-align:center;"|0
! style="background:#1047AB; color:white; text-align:center;"|57
! style="background:#1047AB; color:white; text-align:center;"|2
! style="background:#1047AB; color:white; text-align:center;"|7
|-

Italic: denotes no longer with club.

Captains 
Includes all competitive matches. The list is sorted by shirt number when games are equal.

{| class="wikitable" style="text-align:center"
|-
!style="background:#5d9731; color:white; text-align:center;" width=10%|No.
!style="background:#5d9731; color:white; text-align:center;" width=10%|Pos.
!style="background:#5d9731; color:white; text-align:center;" width=40%|Name
!style="background:#5d9731; color:white; text-align:center;" width=20%|Games
|-
|10
|MF
| Mauro Rosales
| style="text-align:center;"|28
|-
|6
|MF
| Osvaldo Alonso
| style="text-align:center;"|8
|-
|3
|DF
| Brad Evans
| style="text-align:center;"|5
|-
|20
|DF
| Zach Scott
| style="text-align:center;"|1
|-

Italic: denotes no longer with club.

Team statistics 
{|class="wikitable" style="text-align: center;"
|-
! style="background:#5d9731; color:white; text-align:center;"| !! style="background:#5d9731; color:white; text-align:center;"|Total !! style="background:#5d9731; color:white; text-align:center;"|Home !! style="background:#5d9731; color:white; text-align:center;"|Away
|-
|align=left| Games played                 || 42 || 21 || 21
|-
|align=left| Games won                    || 17 || 12 || 5
|-
|align=left| Games drawn                  || 8 || 5 || 3
|-
|align=left| Games lost                   || 17 || 4 || 13
|-
|align=left| Biggest win                  || 4–0 v San Jose Earthquakes || 4–0 v San Jose Earthquakes || 2–0 v Chivas USA
|-
|align=left| Biggest win (League)         || 4–0 v San Jose Earthquakes || 4–0 v San Jose Earthquakes || 2–0 v Chivas USA
|-
|align=left| Biggest win (Playoffs)       || 2–0 v Colorado Rapids || 2–0 v Colorado Rapids || n/a
|-
|align=left| Biggest win (North America)  || 3–1 v Tigres UANL || 3–1 v Tigres UANL || n/a
|-
|align=left| Biggest win (Cup)            || n/a || n/a || n/a
|-
|align=left| Biggest loss                 || 0–4 v Los Angeles Galaxy1–5 v Colorado Rapids || 1–4 v Vancouver Whitecaps FC  || 0–4 v Los Angeles Galaxy1–5 v Colorado Rapids
|-
|align=left| Biggest loss (League)        || 0–4 v Los Angeles Galaxy1–5 v Colorado Rapids || 1–4 v Vancouver Whitecaps FC || 0–4 v Los Angeles Galaxy1–5 v Colorado Rapids
|-
|align=left| Biggest loss (Playoffs)      || 1–2 v Portland Timbers2–3 v Portland Timbers || 1–2 v Portland Timbers || 2–3 v Portland Timbers
|-
|align=left| Biggest loss (North America) || 0–1 v Tigres UANL0–1 v Santos Laguna || 0–1 v Santos Laguna || 0–1 v Tigres UANL
|-
|align=left| Biggest loss (Cup)           || 0–1 v Tampa Bay Rowdies || n/a || 0–1 v Tampa Bay Rowdies
|-
|align=left| Clean sheets                 || 12 || 8 || 4
|-
|align=left| Goals scored                 || 51 || 35 || 16
|-
|align=left| Goals conceded               || 52 || 19 || 33
|-
|align=left| Goal difference              || -1 || +16 || -17
|-
|-
|-
|align=left| Yellow cards     || 57 || 26 || 31
|-
|align=left| Red cards        || 9 || 1 || 8
|-
|align=left| Most appearances ||align=left| Rosales (39) ||align=left| Rosales (19) ||align=left| Rosales (20)
|-
|align=left| Top scorer       ||align=left| Johnson 12  ||align=left| Neagle 8  ||align=left| Johnson 5 
|-
|align=left|Worst discipline  ||align=left| Scott 8  2  ||align=left| Johnson 5  ||align=left| Scott 6  2 
|-
|align=left|Penalties for     || 3/5   || 3/4   || 0/1  
|-
|align=left|Penalties against || 3/3   || 0/0  || 3/3  
|-
|align=left| Points (League)  ||   ||     ||  
|-
|align=left| Winning rate     ||     ||       ||  
|-

Starting XI 

Includes all competitive matches. 		
		
		
		
		
		
		
		
		
		
		
		
		
		
		
		
		
		

Italic: denotes no longer with club.

International call-ups

Awards

MLS All-Stars

Sounders FC MVP

Sounders FC Defender of the Year

Sounders FC Golden Boot

24 Under 24

MLS Player of the Week

AT&T Goal of the Week

MLS Save of the Week

MLS Team of the Week

Sounders FC Humanitarian of the Year

MLS WORKS Humanitarian of the Month

Reserves

MLS Reserves League

League table
West Division

Match results

Miscellany

Allocation ranking 
Seattle is in the No. 3 position in the MLS Allocation Ranking. It swapped its natural position, No. 15, with Chivas USA in the Shalrie Joseph trade. The allocation ranking is the mechanism used to determine which MLS club has first priority to acquire a U.S. National Team player who signs with MLS after playing abroad, or a former MLS player who returns to the league after having gone to a club abroad for a transfer fee. A ranking can be traded, provided that part of the compensation received in return is another club's ranking.

International roster slots 

Seattle has eight MLS International Roster Slots for use in the 2013 season. Each club in Major League Soccer is allocated eight international roster spots and Seattle traded an international spot to Montreal Impact in return for Lamar Neagle.

Kits

Future draft picks

References 

Seattle Sounders FC seasons
Seattle Sounders Football Club
Seattle Sounders Football Club
Seattle Sounders FC